Vorsha is a rural locality (a selo) and the administrative center of Vorshinskoye Rural Settlement, Sobinsky District, Vladimir Oblast, Russia. The population was 1,437 as of 2010. There are 8 streets.

Geography 
Vorsha is located on the right bank of the Vorsha River, 10 km northeast of Sobinka (the district's administrative centre) by road. Konino is the nearest rural locality.

References 

Rural localities in Sobinsky District
Vladimirsky Uyezd